Georgios Daviotis (born 29 June 1998) is a Greek professional footballer who plays as a winger for Super League 2 club Proodeftiki.

Career

Atromitos
On 4 July 2021, Greek Super League side Atromitos announced the extension of his contract for two more years.

Career statistics

Club

References

1998 births
Living people
Greece under-21 international footballers
Greece youth international footballers
Super League Greece players
Atromitos F.C. players
Association football forwards
Footballers from Athens
Greek footballers